German Legion may refer to:

 Legio I Germanica (48 BC - AD 70), a legion in the Roman army
 King's German Legion (1803-1816), a unit of the British Army
 Russian–German Legion (1812-1815), a unit of the Imperial Russian Army and, later, the Prussian Army
  (c. 1823), a unit of volunteers from Germany in the Greek War of Independence, at the call of Friedrich Thiersch
 German Democratic Legion (1849-1849), a unit involved in the Revolution of 1848 in Baden
 British German Legion (1853-1856), a unit of the British Army in the Crimean War
 Independent Battalion of New York Volunteer Infantry (1862-1864), also known as German Legion, a unit of the Union Army during the American Civil War
 , a unit of the Freikorps in the Baltic
 Condor Legion (1936-1939), a unit of volunteers from Germany in the Spanish Civil War

See also
 List of military legions
 French Legion (disambiguation)
 British Legion (disambiguation)
 American Legion (disambiguation)
 Legion (disambiguation)